Iker Unzueta Arregui (born 4 August 1998) is a Spanish footballer who plays as a forward for SD Amorebieta.

Club career
Born in Abadiño, Biscay, Basque Country, Unzueta joined SCD Durango in 2017, from hometown side Abadiño KE. Initially assigned to the reserves in the regional leagues, he also appeared in four matches for the first team during the campaign, achieving promotion from Tercera División.

Unzueta was definitely promoted to the first team in July 2019, after Durango's relegation back to the fourth tier. Roughly one year later, he signed for Segunda División B side SD Amorebieta, featuring regularly as his side achieved a first-ever promotion to Segunda División at the end of the season.

Unzueta made his professional debut on 14 August 2021, starting in a 0–2 away loss against Girona FC. He scored his first professional goal on 3 November, netting his team's third in a 4–1 home routing of Real Valladolid.

References

External links

1998 births
Living people
People from Abadiño
Spanish footballers
Footballers from the Basque Country (autonomous community)
Association football forwards
Segunda División players
Segunda División B players
Tercera División players
SD Amorebieta footballers
Sportspeople from Biscay